The Turnpike House was a historic house in Methuen, Massachusetts.  It was a -story wood-frame structure with a side-gable roof and a granite foundation, with two interior chimneys.  The main entrance was flanked by full-length sidelight windows, and a two-story wing was added to its rear early in the 20th century.  It was built, probably in 1806, after the construction of Essex Turnpike through Methuen, and was one of the city's oldest buildings.  It was listed on the National Register of Historic Places in 1984, and demolished the same year.

See also
 National Register of Historic Places listings in Methuen, Massachusetts
 National Register of Historic Places listings in Essex County, Massachusetts

References

Houses in Methuen, Massachusetts
Houses completed in 1805
National Register of Historic Places in Methuen, Massachusetts
Demolished buildings and structures in Massachusetts
1805 establishments in Massachusetts
Houses on the National Register of Historic Places in Essex County, Massachusetts
Buildings and structures demolished in 1984